2014–15 in Kenyan football may refer to:
 2014 in Kenyan football
 2015 in Kenyan football